The Maryland Maniacs were a professional Indoor Football team based in College Park, Maryland, and a member of the Indoor Football League. The team began play in 2009 as an expansion team in the Indoor Football League. The Maniacs were the second indoor football team to be based in Maryland, following the Chesapeake Tide of the Continental Indoor Football League, who played in the same market. The owner of the Maniacs was Messay Hailemariam. The Maniacs played their home games at Cole Field House. Inaugural season home games were held at The Show Place Arena. They left the Indoor Football League in 2011, and have been with American Indoor Football ever since (being re-branded as the Maryland Eagles).

Franchise history

2009

Schedule

2010

Final roster

Season-by-season

Season-by-season results
Note: The Finish, Wins, Losses, and Ties columns list regular season results and exclude any postseason play.

References

External links
 Official Maryland Maniacs website
 Official Chesapeake Tide website
 Tide's 2007 Stats

Defunct American football teams in Maryland
Former Indoor Football League teams
Prince George's County, Maryland
American football teams established in 2008
American football teams disestablished in 2011
2008 establishments in Maryland
2011 disestablishments in Maryland